Estació de França ("France Station") is a major railway station in the city of Barcelona in Catalonia, Spain.

Estació de França is the second busiest railway station of the city after Barcelona-Sants in terms of regional and long-distance ridership. It may lose this status, however, with the arrival of the AVE high-speed train in Sants and the construction of Estació de la Sagrera, planned for completion at the end of 2023, that will concentrate most of the traffic.

History

A railway station was first built here in the 19th century as the main terminus for trains arriving from France (as its name still suggests) but also for services to North East Catalonia and the Costa Brava.

Rebuilt and reopened for the 1929 International Exhibition, the two monumental buildings that make up the station were designed by the architect Pedro Muguruza and inaugurated by King Alfonso XIII. They surround the railway tracks in the shape of a 'U'. In total, the station's structure is 29 m tall and 195 m long. The station was closed for renovation between from 1988 and 1992, reopening for the Olympic Games of 1992.

Architecture
It is generally seen as the city's most beautiful station. It is worth seeing in its own right for the restrained mix of classical and more modern style that is complete with decoration in marble, bronze and crystal and its modernista and art déco motifs. Over the last three decades it has been eclipsed as Barcelona's main station by the underground sprawl of Sants. Indeed, most other stations of Barcelona are at least partly underground.

The station's status as the terminus for international trains from and through France ended with the discontinuation of the overnight 'trenhotels' in 2013, which coincided with the introduction of the new high-speed daytime TGV services to Paris, Toulouse, Lyons and Marseilles, all of which call at or terminate at Sants.

Part of the original building now belongs to Pompeu Fabra University, serving as its "França building".

Lines

The station accommodates twelve tracks and seven platforms.  It is the terminus for a number of RENFE services:
 Rodalies Barcelona: R10 - the half-hourly Barcelona International Airport train via central Barcelona (Passeig de Gràcia railway station and Sants), but suspended for AVE works, temporarily served by R2 SUD to central Barcelona (Passeig de Gràcia railway station and Sants), Viladecans, Gavà, Castelldefels, Sitges, Vilanova i la Geltrú, Calafell and Sant Vicenç de Calders
 Medium-distance (Renfe Media Distancia): Ca1, Ca3, Ca4, Ca6

The station is often also used as backup terminal when parts of the railway network are undergoing maintenance; the station received a wide variety of services during upgrades to the Aragó tunnel during winter of 2008.

Location
The station is located in the east of the city, down between the docks and the zoo. Although it does not have its own metro station, it is easily accessible: directly on the R10 line through central Barcelona (Sants and Passeig de Gràcia), as well as a good five-minute walk from Barceloneta station on line 4 of the Barcelona Metro.

Gallery

Accidents and incidents
On 28 July 2017, a train crashed into metal barriers at the station.

See also
List of railway stations in Barcelona
List of Rodalies Barcelona railway stations
Estació de Sants
Estació de la Sagrera

References

External links

Estació de França at Catalunya Turisme
Estació de França at Todotrenes.com
Extensive photo gallery at Trenscat.com

Railway stations in Barcelona
Railway stations in Spain opened in 1929
Transport in Ciutat Vella
Rodalies de Catalunya stations
Railway stations in Spain opened in 1848